Porcellana sayana is a species of porcelain crab that lives in the western Atlantic Ocean, often as a commensal of hermit crabs. It is red with white spots, and has a characteristic bulge behind each claw.

Distribution
Porcellana sayana is found along the western coast of the Atlantic Ocean, from Cape Hatteras (United States) to Brazil, including the Gulf of Mexico and the Caribbean Sea.

Description
It may be distinguished from other species by the form of the first pereiopod; the carpus (last segment before the claw) of that leg bears a lobe which projects forwards. It has a fringe of setae along the front of its claws, which it uses in filter feeding.

Ecology
Like another porcelain crab, Petrolisthes galathinus, Porcellana sayana is parasitised by the bopyrid isopod Aporobopyrus curtatus, which lives in the porcelain crab's gill chamber.

Taxonomy
Porcellana sayana was first described by William Elford Leach in 1820 as Pisidia sayana. Its common names include "spotted porcelain crab" and "Say's porcellanid".

References

Porcelain crabs
Crustaceans of the Atlantic Ocean
Crustaceans described in 1820
Taxa named by William Elford Leach